Rukai is a Formosan language spoken by the Rukai people in Taiwan. It is a member of the Austronesian language family. The Rukai language comprises six dialects, which are Budai, Labuan, Maga, Mantauran, Tanan and Tona. The number of speakers of the six Rukai dialects is estimated to be about 10,000. Some of them are monolingual. There are varying degrees of mutual intelligibility among the Rukai dialects. Rukai is notable for its distinct grammatical voice system among the Formosan languages.

Classification

Paul Jen-kuei Li considers Rukai to be the first language to have split from the Proto-Austronesian language. Below are the estimated divergence dates of various Formosan languages from Li (2008:215).

 Proto-Austronesian: 4,500 BCE
 Rukai: 3,000 BCE
 Tsouic: 2,500 BCE (split into Tsou and Southern Tsouic around 1,000 BCE)
 Most other splits: 2,000 to 0 BCE
 Western Plains: 1,000 CE

Classifications by various scholars repeatedly find that Rukai is one of the, and often the, most divergent of the Austronesian languages. It is therefore prime evidence for reconstructing Proto-Austronesian. Ross (2009) notes that to date, reconstructions had not taken Rukai into account, and therefore cannot be considered valid for the entire family.

Dialects
Rukai is unique for being the only Formosan language without a focus system.

Tanan Rukai is also the Formosan language with the largest consonant inventory, with 23 consonants and 4 vowels having length contrast. Tanan Rukai also makes an animate/inanimate instead of a personal/non-personal one as most other Formosan languages do.

Mantauran is one of the most divergent dialects. Li (2001) classifies them as follows:

Rukai
Mantauran (萬山 Wanshan, also 'oponoho): 250–300 speakers
(Main branch)
Maga–Tona
Maga (馬加 Majia)
Tona (多納 Duona)
Budai–Tanan (Rukai Proper)
Budai (霧台 Wutai)
Tanan (大南 Danan; also Taromak)

Geographic distribution
According to Zeitoun (2007:4), there are a total of 6 Rukai dialects spoken in 12 different villages.

Together, Maga, Tona, and Mantauran are also known as the "Lower Three Villages." Rukai have also recently in Sandimen Township and southern  Sanhe Village, Majia Township, where there are many Paiwan. Sanhe Village is also where the Budai Rukai originally lived in before they relocated to Wutai Township in the mid-1900s.

Phonology

Most Rukai dialects have four vowels and retroflex and interdental consonants.

Budai Rukai has four vowels, .  is not a schwa but a full vowel.

The following table displays the consonant inventory of Mantauran Rukai, with written representations that differ from their IPA representations given in angle brackets (Zeitoun 2007):

4 vowels, written a, i, e, o

Grammar

Morphology
Basic Mantauran Rukai syllables take on a basic  structure, with words usually ranging from 2 to 4 syllables long (Zeitoun 2007). There are four morphological processes.

Affixation
Stem modification
Reduplication
Compounding

The following reduplication patterns occur in Budai Rukai (Austronesian Comparative Dictionary).

Reduplication of the noun stem
N + RED 'a great amount'
N(umeral or period) + RED 'lasting for a period of...'

Reduplication of the verb stem
V + RED 'continuous, keep doing, do repeatedly'
V + RED 'future'
V (stative) + RED 'intensity, comparatively greater'

In Budai Rukai, reduplication of a bound stem can also be used to create certain basic nouns and verbs, such as 'thunder,' 'mountain,' and 'to scrape' (Austronesian Comparative Dictionary).

Based on an analysis of the Budai (Kucapungan) dialect, Rukai is said to be unusual among Formosan languages for having a dichotomous active-passive voice system, (Chen & Sung, 2005) which may include voices such agent, patient, locative, or instrumental focus. Stan Starosta considers this to be an indication that Rukai is the first offshoot of the Austronesian language family (Zeitoun, 2007). However, this dichotomy has been challenged (Chen, 2005).

Active / Agent Focus (AF): prefix u-/w-
Passive / Patient Focus (PF): prefix ki-

Syntax
Unlike most other Formosan languages, Rukai has an accusative case-marking system instead of an ergative one typical of Austronesian-aligned languages (Zeitoun 2007). There are two types of clauses in Mantauran Rukai:

Nominal
Verbal

Complementalization can take on four strategies (Zeitoun 2007).

Zero strategy (i.e. paratactic complements)
Verb serialization
Nominalization
Causativization

Definite objects can be topicalized in both active and passive sentences.

Function words
Below are some Mantauran Rukai function words from Zeitoun (2007).

la – and
mani – then

Word classes
Zeitoun (2007) distinguishes eleven word classes in Mantauran Rukai:.

Nouns
Verbs
Pronouns
Demonstratives
Numerals
Adverbs
Phrasal elements
Clausal elements
Interclausal elements
Exclamations
Interjections

Verbs
Below are some Mantauran Rukai verb affixes from Zeitoun (2007).

Dynamic verbs: o-; very rarely om- and m-
Stative verbs: ma-
Negating prefix: ki-
Causative: pa-
ʔini-Ca- "(one)self"
mati- "well"
k-in-a ... aə "... more"
ʔako- "barely, just"
ka- "in fact"
mata ... aə "certainly"

Pronouns
Below are Rukai pronouns from Zeitoun (1997). Note that Mantauran Rukai pronouns are usually bound.

Affixes

Budai Rukai
The list of Budai Rukai affixes below is sourced from Chen (2006:199-203).

Prefixes
a- 'become'
ana- 'if'
api- 'like', 'want'
i- 'at', 'in'
ki- 'to gather', 'to collect'
ki- 'Dative Focus'
ki- 'to dig
ku- 'to remove'
ku- 'Free Pronoun marker'
ku- 'Past marker'
la- 'Plural'
lu- 'Future'
ma- 'Stative Verb'
ma- 'reciprocal'
ma- 'dual (two people)'
mu- 'to remove'
mu- 'self-motion'
- 'ordinal'
nai- 'have done'
ŋi- 'to move in certain direction'
ŋi- '-self'
ŋu- 'to ride'
pa- 'causative'
paŋu- 'by'
sa- 'body parts'
sa- 'when'
si- 'verbal prefix'
si- 'to wear'
sini- 'from'
su- 'to clean'
su- 'belong'
ta- 'to feel'
taru- 'certain'
tu- 'to mark'
tua- 'to wash'
θi- 'to release'
u-/w- 'Agent Focus'

Suffixes
-a 'imperative'
-a 'Accusative Case'
-ana 'still', 'yet'
-anə 'nominalize'
-ŋa 'completive'
-ŋa 'close to'

Infixes
 'past tense; non-future'
 'realis'
 'Goal subject', 'Past time'

Circumfixes
aanə 'future state'
aanə 'nominalizer'
kaanə 'real or genuine'
kalaanə 'season'
saanə 'instrument'
sanuanə 'left-over'
sanulə 'frequency'
taanə 'time', 'location'

Compound (Multiple) Affixes
la-ma- 'plural marker'
ɭi-tara- 'have to', must'
sa-ka- 'household'
sa-ka-uanə ; the whole'
sa-ka-si-... l-anə  the ... generation
ta-ra-  for a period of time
ta-ra-  be good at
t-in-uanə  personal relation

Mantauran Rukai
The following list of Mantauran Rukai affixes is sourced from Zeitoun (2007).

a- 'when'
a- (action/state nominalization)
a- 'plural'
-a 'beyond (in time or space)'
-a 'irrealis'
-a 'imperative'
-ae (state nominalization)
aae; allomorph: ... -ae (objective nominalization; negative imperative)
amo- 'will'
-ane (meaning unknown; used on verbs to insult someone)
-a-nga 'imperative' (mild requests)
apaa- 'reciprocal causative' (dynamic verbs)
apano- 'like to, prone to, have a tendency to'
apa'a 'reciprocal causative' (stative verbs)
apa'ohi- 'split (causative form)'
-ci 'snivel'
dh- 'invisible'
i- 'at'
-i 'irrealis'
-ie (marking of the oblique case on personal and impersonal pronouns)
-ka 'predicative negation'
ka- 'in fact, indeed, actually'
kaae 'genuine, real, original'
kalaae 'temporal nominalization'
kapa ~ kama- 'continuously'
kapa ...-nga 'all, every'
ki- 'modal negation'
kiae 'whose'
kaae 'more and more'
la- 'plural'
la-ma'a- 'reciprocal'
-lo 'plural' (demonstrative pronouns)
m- (dynamic (finite and subjunctive) verbs; alternates with k-, p-, or Ø in its non-finite form)
ma- (stative (finite and subjunctive) verbs; alternates with ka- in its non-finite form)
male (forms 'tens')
ma-Ca- 'reciprocity' (dynamic (finite and subjunctive) verbs; alternates with pa-Ca; Ca refers to the reduplication of the first consonant)
maa- 'reciprocity' (dynamic (finite and subjunctive) verbs; alternates with paa)
maae (~ paae; maa- (dual reciprocal) + -e (meaning unknown))
 'each/both'
maatalile/lo '(a number of) floors'
maka- 'finish'
makale/lo (~ pakale/lo) 'up to N-/for N- days/months/years'
maka'an- (attaches only to aleve 'below' and lrahalre 'above')
 (~  'all'
Mali- (~ pali) 'along'
ma'ohi (~ pa'ohi) 'split'
m-o- (~ o-) 'holds X's ritual (where X = household name)' (attaches to household names to form dynamic verbs)
m-o- (~ o-) 'toward'
mo- 'anti-causative'
m-ore (~ ore-) 'perform'
mota'a- (~ ota'a-) 'raise'
n- 'visible'
-na 'still'
naa- 'continuously'
-nae 'place where'
-nae 'time when'
-nga 'already'
-nga 'superlative'
ni- 'counterfactuality (irrealis)'
nia 'concessive'
o- 'dynamic / finite / realis / active'
oe 'dress well' (derives verbs from nouns)
o-ara- 'only' (attached to verbs)
o-ka'ale/lo (~ ko'ale/lo) 'a number of recipients'
om- (~ m- / ~ Ø) 'dynamic / finite / realis / active'
o-tali (~ tali- / ~ toli) 'wrap up, pack up'
o-tali (~ tali-) 'made of'
o-tara- (~ tara-) 'a number of months / years'
taro- (doublet form: tao-) 'group of persons in movement'
o-ta'i- (~ ta'i-) 'precede'
o-'ara- (~ 'ara-) 'early'
pa- 'causative'
pa- 'every N-times'
 'stick to, think about'
pa'aae '(what is) left'
pe- 'forbiddance (?)'
pi- 'local causative'
po- 'causative of movement'
po- 'bear, grow N' (attaches to nouns)
saka- 'external'
samori- 'keep on ...-ing' (attaches only to the root kane 'to eat')
sa'api- 'prone to, inclined to'
so- 'tribute'
ta- (subjective nominalization)
ta- 'inalienability' (kinship and color terms)
 'place where'
taae 'time when'
tan-ae (forms derived locative nominal)
taka- 'a number of persons'
tako- 'while'
tala- 'container' (?; found only with the root ove'eke)
tali- 'belong to'
ta'a- 'with (a group of persons)'
ta'ale/lo 'measure with an extended arm' (bound numerals)
to- 'do, make, produce, build'
 'use ... for, by ...-ing'
to'a- 'use ... to, for'
'a- 'instrument/manner nominalizer'
'ae 'have a lot of'
'aa- 'turn into'
'aka- 'Nth' (ordinal prefix 'a- + stative marker ka- (non-finite form))
'ako- (doublet form: 'akoae) 'speak (out)'
'ako- 'barely, a little'
'akole 'say a number of times'
'akonga 'more'
'ali- 'from (in time or space)' (<  'aliki '(come) from')
'ano- 'walk, ride, take'
'ano- 'unknown meaning' (only attaches to stative roots)
'ano-Ca- 'along/with a number of persons (in movement)' (attaches to bound numeral forms and certain other roots)
'anoae 'entirely, completely, cease, alleviate'
'aole/lo 'the Nth time' (ordinal prefix 'a- + 'ole/lo 'a number of times')
'apakale/lo 'the Nth day' (ordinal prefix 'a- + pakale/lo 'up to/for a number of days / months / years)
'api- 'like ... -ing'
'a-po- 'as a result of'
'apo- 'come out'
'asaae 'what's the use of'
'asi- (meaning unknown; found only once in the word 'work')
'i- 'passive'
'i- 'verbalizer' (from nouns; polysemous prefix). Semantic core of 'i-N is 'get, obtain-N', although it can also be glossed as 'get, harvest, gather, look after, bear, have for, kill, etc.'
'i- 'put on, wear' (derives verbs from nouns)
'ia-... ae 'because of, out of'
'ini- 'movement toward'
'ini- 'cross'
'ini- 'consume'
'ini-Ca- '(one)self' (reflexive)
'iniae 'pretend'
'ini(-ae) 'behave like, look like' (derived from  'inilrao 'resemble')
'ira- 'for' (derived from  'iraki '(do) for')
'o- 'take off'
'ole/lo 'a number of times' (attaches to bound numerals)
'ole/lo 'measure' (must be followed by certain words to indicate a measure with the hand, foot, ruler, etc.)
'o-tali 'unpack'

The following list of Budai Rukai affixes is sourced from the Comparative Austronesian Dictionary (1995).

Nominal affixes
kaanə + N 'something real or genuine
ko- + Pronoun 'nominative'
 + N (numeral) 'ordinal'
sa-... anə + V 'instrument, tool'
sa- + N 'some body parts'
taanə + N 'location, time'
ta-ra + N 'agentive, a person specialised in...'

Verbal affixes
-a- + V 'realis'
-a + V 'imperative'
ki- + N 'to gather, to collect, to harvest'
ki- + V 'dative-focus, involuntary action'
ko- + N 'to remove, to peel'
ko- + V 'intransitive, patient-focus'
ma- + V 'mutual, reciprocal'
maa- + V 'stative'
mo- + N 'to discharge, remove'
mo- + V '(to go) self-motion, non-causative'
ŋi- + V 'to act or to move in a certain direction or manner'
ŋo- + N 'to ride'
pa- + V 'causative'
si- + V (bound stem) 'verbal prefix'
si- + N 'to wear, to carry, to possess'
so- + N 'to spit, to clean, to give out'
to- + N 'to make, produce, bring forth'
θi + N 'to release'
w- + V 'agent-focus, verbal prefix'

Notes

References

External links

 Yuánzhùmínzú yǔyán xiànshàng cídiǎn 原住民族語言線上詞典  – Rukai search page at the "Aboriginal language online dictionary" website of the Indigenous Languages Research and Development Foundation
 Rukai teaching and learning materials published by the Council of Indigenous Peoples of Taiwan 
 Rukai translation of President Tsai Ing-wen's 2016 apology to indigenous people – published on the website of the presidential office

Formosan languages